The 1942 Manhattan Beach Coast Guard football team represented the United States Coast Guard's training school at Manhattan Beach, Brooklyn, during the 1942 college football season. The team compiled a 6–0–1 record and was ranked No. 9 among the service teams in a poll of 91 sports writers conducted by the Associated Press.

The team was coached by Gar Griffith, who both played and coached football at Ohio State before the war, and Pug Vaughan, who was a player-coach. Notable players included Esco Sarkkinen, Mike Karmazin, and Eulace Peacock. Lt. Commander Jack Dempsey, the former heavyweight champion of the world, was the director of physical education; he was referred to in press coverage as the team's "water boy."

Schedule

References

Manhattan Beach Coast Guard
Manhattan Beach Coast Guard Depth Bombers football
College football undefeated seasons
Manhattan Beach Coast Guard Depth Bombers football